Vadim Nikolayevich Firsov (born 22 June 1978) is a former Russian professional footballer.

External links
 

1978 births
Footballers from Moscow
Living people
Russian footballers
Association football defenders
Russian expatriate footballers
Expatriate footballers in Ukraine
Ukrainian Premier League players
FC Metallurg Lipetsk players
FC Zirka Kropyvnytskyi players
FC Zorya Luhansk players
FC Vityaz Podolsk players
FC Zvezda Irkutsk players
FC Avangard Kursk players
FC Znamya Truda Orekhovo-Zuyevo players
FC Volga Ulyanovsk players